George Strickland may refer to: 

 George Strickland (baseball) (1926–2010), American baseball player and manager
 Sir George Strickland, 7th Baronet (1782–1874), English MP
 George Strickland (politician) (born 1942), member of the Western Australian Legislative Assembly

See also
 George Strickland Kingston (1807–1880), South Australia surveyor and politician